Rakitovica is a village in Croatia.

Populated places in Osijek-Baranja County